Arctia lapponica is a moth of the family Erebidae first described by Carl Peter Thunberg in 1791. It is found in northern Eurasia and the Arctic part of North America.

The wingspan is 37–45 mm.

The larvae feed on Betula nana, Vaccinium uliginosum and Rubus chamaemorus.

This species was formerly a member of the genus Pararctia, but was moved to Arctia along with the other species of the genera Acerbia, Pararctia, Parasemia, Platarctia, and Platyprepia.

Subspecies
Arctia lapponica lapponica (Polar Eurasia)
Arctia lapponica lemniscata (Stichel, 1911) (mountains of eastern Yakutia)
Arctia lapponica hyperborea (Curtis, 1835)
Arctia lapponica gibsoni (Bang-Haas, 1927)

References

External links
 
 "Nordlig bjørnespinner". Norwegian Lepidoptera. Naturhistorisk museum. Archived March 29, 2012. 

Arctiina
Moths of North America
Moths of Europe
Insects of the Arctic
Moths described in 1791